A friend-to-friend (or F2F) computer network is a type of peer-to-peer network in which users only make direct connections with people they know. Passwords or digital signatures can be used for authentication.

Unlike other kinds of private P2P, users in a friend-to-friend network cannot find out who else is participating beyond their own circle of friends, so F2F networks can grow in size without compromising their users' anonymity. Retroshare, WASTE, GNUnet, Freenet and OneSwarm are examples of software that can be used to build F2F networks, though RetroShare is the only one of these configured for friend-to-friend operation by default.

Many F2F networks support indirect anonymous or pseudonymous communication between users who do not know or trust one another. For example, a node in a friend-to-friend overlay can automatically forward a file (or a request for a file) anonymously between two friends, without telling either of them the other's name or IP address. These friends can in turn automatically forward the same file (or request) to their own friends, and so on.

Dan Bricklin coined the term "friend-to-friend network" in 2000.

Potential applications of F2F 
The Bouillon project uses a friend-to-friend network to assign trust ratings to messages.

See also 
 Darknet
 LAN messenger
 Private peer-to-peer
 Web of trust

References 
B.C. Popescu, B. Crispo, and A.S. Tanenbaum. "Safe and Private Data Sharing with Turtle: Friends Team-Up and Beat the System." In 12th International Workshop on Security Protocols, Cambridge, UK, April 2004.
T. Chothia and K. Chatzikokolakis. "A Survey of Anonymous Peer-to-Peer File-Sharing." In Proceedings of the IFIP International Symposium on Network-Centric Ubiquitous Systems (NCUS 2005), Nagasaki, Japan, volume 3823 of Lecture Notes in Computer Science, pages 744–755. Springer, 2005.
J. Li and F. Dabek. "F2F: Reliable Storage in Open Networks." In 5th International Workshop on Peer-to-Peer Systems (IPTPS '06), Santa Barbara, CA, USA, February 2006.
M. Rogers and S. Bhatti. "How to Disappear Completely: A Survey of Private Peer-to-Peer Networks." In 1st International Workshop on Sustaining Privacy in Collaborative Environments (SPACE 2007), Moncton, NB, Canada, July 2007.
Numbered references:

External links 

Friend2Friend.net, An XML scripting language for writing F2F software
Discussion about F2F  involving Ian Clarke of Freenet
F2F page at altruists.org 

Applications of cryptography
Internet privacy

Peer-to-peer

Authentication
2000s neologisms